Ariyamangalam is one of the four zones of the Tiruchirappalli Municipal Corporation. One of SIDCO's two Tiruchirappalli-based industrial estates is located in Ariyamangalam.

Notes 
 

Neighbourhoods and suburbs of Tiruchirappalli